Arnesen is a Danish-Norwegian patronymic surname meaning “son of Arne”.  

Notable people with the surname include: 

Arne Arnesen (1928–2010), Norwegian diplomat and politician
Bodil Arnesen (born 1967), Norwegian operatic soprano
Christian Arnesen (1890–1956), Norwegian wrestler
Deborah Arnie Arnesen (born 1953), American politician
Dag Arnesen (born 1950), Norwegian jazz pianist
Eric Arnesen (born 1958), American historian
Frank Arnesen (born 1956), Danish footballer
Heidi Arnesen, Norwegian orienteering competitor
Kim André Arnesen (born 1980), Norwegian composer
Lasse Arnesen (born 1965), Norwegian alpine skier
Liv Arnesen (born 1953), Norwegian cross-country skier
Randolf Arnesen (1880–1958), Norwegian trade unionist, cooperativist and politician

Danish-language surnames
Norwegian-language surnames